Kimmo Leinonen (born 30 August 1949) is a Finnish ice hockey executive and writer. He was the director of public relations and marketing for the International Ice Hockey Federation (IIHF) from 1995 to 2007, and held similar positions for SM-liiga and Ilves. He served as general secretary of the 2012 and 2013 Ice Hockey World Championships co-hosted in Finland and Sweden. He also coached junior ice hockey for Ilves, managed the Ilves Naiset who won three Naisten SM-sarja championships, was a scout for the New York Rangers, and a sports commentator for hockey broadcasts in Finland.

Leinonen was a founding member of the Finnish Hockey Hall of Fame in 1979, and helped establish the IIHF Hall of Fame in 1996. He served as chairman of the Finnish Hockey Hall of Fame from 2011 to 2018, and has written multiple books on the history of hockey in Finland. He was inducted into the builder category of the Finnish Hockey Hall of Fame in 2011, and was named the 2023 recipient of the Paul Loicq Award from the IIHF.

Early life
Kimmo Leinonen was born 30 August 1949, in Tampere, Finland. He became interested in ice hockey as a youth after his older brother took him to watch Ilves play, and when the team's captain Pentti Isotalo was his elementary school teacher in grade three.

Ice hockey career

Beginnings in Finland

Leinonen began his hockey career in the mid-1970s as the junior ice hockey coach for Ilves, and the club's marketing manager. When the Finnish Hockey Hall of Fame was established on 14 June 1979, Leinonen was one of its six founding members. Its museum first opened at the Tampere Ice Stadium in December 1979.

Leinonen was a scout for the New York Rangers from 1978–79 to 1982–83, and worked in the ice hockey stick industry in Germany and Canada at the same time. He was the marketing manager for SM-liiga from 1984 to 1988, after which he was a sports commentator for hockey broadcasts in Finland. He also served as manager of the Ilves women's team from 1990–91 to 1993–94, who were Naisten SM-sarja champions in 1991, 1992 and 1993.

International Ice Hockey Federation
Leinonen served as the director of public relations and marketing for the International Ice Hockey Federation (IIHF) from 1995 to 2007. After assuming the role, he collaborated with IIHF vice-president Walter Bush to establish the IIHF Hall of Fame in 1996.

Leinonen served as secretary of the IIHF marketing committee and the IIHF Hall of Fame committee from 1998 to 2003, and was the editor-in-chief of the media guide for ice hockey at the Winter Olympic Games. He was also a technical delegate to four Olympic Games and 14 Ice Hockey World Championships from 1998 to 2010, and served as chairman of more than 40 IIHF men's and women's events from 1995 to 2022.

Return to Finland
Leinonen served as general secretary of the 2012 IIHF World Championship and 2013 IIHF World Championship, which were co-hosted by Finland and Sweden. He joined the Finnish Ice Hockey Association in August 2007, to begin work on the events. Finland had last hosted the World Championship in 2003, and naming Leinonen to oversee the event "gave Finland credibility as a candidate country", according to IIHF vice-president Kalervo Kummola.

Leinonen served as chairman of the Finnish Hockey Hall of Fame from 2011 to 2018. After the exhibits moved into their new home at the Vapriikki Museum Centre in the early-2000s, Leinonen remarked that the hall of fame had evolved into "a place where you can also experiment and participate for yourself, not just watch". By the end of his tenure, the number of visitors had increased to 200,000 people per year.

Writing career
In retirement, Leinonen focused on writing books on the history of Finnish hockey.

List of publications:

  (2012, 2013; Hockey World: Lion Trail)
  (2014; Heroes of Koulukatu: The history of ice hockey in Tampere 1928–1965)
  (2015, 2022; Hockey Lions)
  (2015; First in Finland: Hakametsä ice rink and Ice Hockey World Championships 1965)
  (2016; Lions in a gold hunt)
  (2016; Ice hockey record book)
  (2017; Hockey legends as collectible cards)
  (2018; Great hockey book)
  (2018; Lions of the whole nation: The history of the Suomi-puck)

Personal life
Leinonen has a daughter who was involved in hockey, and once had partial ownership in a racehorse. He was a lifelong friend of hockey player Aarne Honkavaara.

In 2017, Leinonen pleaded guilty to tax fraud and was sentenced to six months and 15 days suspended imprisonment. He failed to pay  in taxes on a property he sold in Switzerland, where he had lived while working for the IIHF.

Honors and awards
Leinonen is an honorary lifetime member of Ilves, and was inducted into the builder category of the Finnish Hockey Hall of Fame in 2011, as Lion number 211.

In December 2022, the IIHF named Leinonen the recipient of the Paul Loicq Award for 2023. The award will be given during the IIHF Hall of Fame induction ceremony, prior to the medal games of the 2023 IIHF World Championship in Tampere.

References

1949 births
Living people
21st-century Finnish non-fiction writers
Finnish ice hockey administrators
Finnish ice hockey coaches
Finnish male writers
Finnish marketing people
Finnish public relations people
Finnish sports announcers
Ice hockey commentators
Ice hockey people from Tampere
International Ice Hockey Federation executives
New York Rangers scouts
Paul Loicq Award recipients